Jeff Miracola (born October 10, 1971) is an American fantasy artist, children's book artist, and illustrator.

Miracola created illustrations for the children's book, Welcome to Monster Isle, along with children's author Oliver Chin in 2008. Miracola's illustrations have also appeared in ImagineFX magazine, The Duelist magazine, Advanced Photoshop magazine, and on a Target Corporation gift card. In the gaming industry, he is best known for his work in the collectible card game Magic: The Gathering, the Shadowrun role-playing game and collectible card game, as well as the Dungeons & Dragons role-playing game. Miracola also created illustrations for the Electronic Arts video game, Mini-Golf, available on the Apple iPod.

Early life and education
Miracola was born in Baltimore, Maryland in 1971, the second of two children.

Miracola grew up in Milwaukee, Wisconsin where he attended the Milwaukee High School of the Arts. During his high school years, a friend introduced him to the work of Frank Frazetta, Boris Vallejo, Berni Wrightson, Michael Kaluta, Gerald Brom and Jeff Jones, all of whom he cites as creative influences. In 1991, he attended college at the Milwaukee Institute of Art & Design, but left college after two years to begin a freelance art career.

Career
Miracola began his illustration career in 1993, working as a freelance artist for Wizards of the Coast, FASA Corporation, Steve Jackson Games, White Wolf Game Studios, and many other companies in the role-playing game and collectible card game industry. He also did conceptual toy design for Warner Bros. Batman Beyond and Nickelodeon's Animorphs, through Hasbro, Inc. In 2008, Miracola collaborated with author Oliver Chin to create the children's book Welcome to Monster Isle, which is targeted at ages 4 to 8. His work received a favorable review in The Horn Book Guide to Children's and Young Adult Books, with the critic referring to the "slick illustrations".

Personal life
Miracola works and lives in Wisconsin with his wife and three children.

Works

Books
Welcome to Monster Isle, 2008
Mail Me Art: Going Postal with the World's Best Illustrators and Designers
World of Warcraft: The Art of the Trading Card Game
Expose Vol. 4, Ballistic Publishing
Spectrum: The Best in Contemporary Fantastic Art, Volumes 2, 3,4,5, and 15
The Art of Magic: the Gathering
High Tech & Low Life: The Art of Shadowrun
30 Years of Adventure: A Celebration of Dungeons & Dragons

Magazines
ImagineFX magazine (Future Publishing)
Advanced Photoshop Magazine (Imagine Publishing)
Dragon Magazine (Wizards of the Coast)
The Duelist magazine (Wizards of the Coast)

Card games
Magic: the Gathering (Wizards of the Coast)
World of Warcraft (Upper Deck)
Rage (White Wolf)
Battletech (FASA)
Shadowrun (FASA)
Deadlands (Five Rings Publishing Group)
Judge Dredd (Target Games)
Vampire: The Eternal Struggle (Wizards of the Coast)

Video games
Mini-Golf (Electronic Arts)
Hearthstone (Blizzard Entertainment)

References

Additional sources
 Spectrum: The Best in Contemporary Fantastic Art, Volume 2
 Spectrum: The Best in Contemporary Fantastic Art, Volume 3
 Spectrum: The Best in Contemporary Fantastic Art, Volume 4
 Spectrum: The Best in Contemporary Fantastic Art, Volume 5
 Spectrum: The Best in Contemporary Fantastic Art, Volume 15
 The Art of Magic: The Gathering
 World of Warcraft: The Art of the Trading Card Game

External links
Jeff Miracola's website
Jeff Miracola at Immedium, Inc.
Interview with Jeff Miracola at Woosta.com
Interview with Jeff Miracola at HireAnIllustrator.com

1971 births
American illustrators
Fantasy artists
Game artists
Living people
Role-playing game artists